The Paper Dolls were a late 1960s British female vocal trio from Northampton, comprising lead vocalist Susie 'Tiger' Mathis, Pauline 'Spyder' Bennett and Sue 'Copper' Marshall. They were one of the few British girl groups of the late sixties.

Each member of the group had a nickname, similar to the Spice Girls three decades later.

Career

"Something Here in My Heart"
Signed to Pye Records, Paper Dolls had one solitary success. The song "Something Here in My Heart (Keeps A Tellin' Me No)", which was their debut single, and was written by Tony Macaulay and John Macleod, reached Number 11 in the UK Singles Chart in 1968. The Dolls also recorded another Macaulay/Macleod hit composition "Baby Take Me in Your Arms." The enduring image of the Paper Dolls, as seen on Top of the Pops, was inescapably that of three young women in miniskirts, the popularity and brevity of which were at their height at the time. The name of the group was suggestive of "dolly birds", a rather impersonal term which, in the 1970s journalist Christopher Booker associated with "girls [being] transformed into throwaway plastic objects".

Follow-up releases
Several follow-ups, notably "My Life (Is in Your Hands)" and "Someday", failed to chart. Their greatest disappointment came when their producers arranged for them to record another Macaulay co-composition "Build Me Up Buttercup" later that year. Due to a misunderstanding, they never turned up for the session, and instead the song was given to The Foundations, whose version became a hit single. The flip side of "Someday", titled "Any Old Time (You're Lonely and Sad)" was recorded by The Foundations, for whom it charted in the UK.

The Paper Dolls released one album, titled Paper Dolls House in 1968, which was re-issued with bonus tracks on CD in 2001. The first release included a cover of The Beach Boys' song "Darlin'"; the later version substituted a cover of the Paul McCartney song "Step Inside Love".

In 1970, they signed to RCA. Two further singles, a cover of The Angels' "My Boyfriend's Back" and the original song "Remember December" (featuring backing vocals by Brian Connolly – later of Sweet) did not chart, and the trio split up. They remain as one-hit wonders.

After the split
In 1978, billed as Tiger Sue, Mathis released a solo single of the song "When You Walk in the Room".
Mathis was a vocal coach for the St Winifred's School Choir, whose single "There's No-one Quite Like Grandma" was a Christmas number one in 1980.
Mathis became a local radio presenter, appearing on Piccadilly Radio and BBC Radio Manchester.
Mathis became a fundraising coordinator for the "Kirsty Appeal" on behalf of the Francis House Children's Hospice in Didsbury, Manchester, and was involved with various other cancer charities. She was diagnosed with breast cancer in 2004.

Personnel
Tiger – born Susanne Mathis, 29 April 1947, South London
Copper – born Susan Marshall, 21 April 1948, Nottingham, Nottinghamshire
Spyder – born Pauline Bennett, 28 July 1948, Bletchley, Buckinghamshire

Discography (UK)

References

External links
[ Paper Dolls biography] at Allmusic website
Paper Dolls single discography at the 45-rpm website

English girl groups
British musical trios
Vocal trios
English pop music groups
Musical groups established in 1966
Musical groups disestablished in 1970